Saskatoon Centre is a provincial electoral district for the Legislative Assembly of Saskatchewan, Canada. It is one of 13 districts covering the province's largest city, Saskatoon.

Members of the Legislative Assembly

Electoral history

References

External links 
Website of the Legislative Assembly of Saskatchewan

Saskatchewan provincial electoral districts
Politics of Saskatoon